Simone Blanc is a French retired slalom canoeist who competed in the mid-1960s. She won a bronze medal in the mixed C-2 team event at the 1965 ICF Canoe Slalom World Championships in Spittal.

References

French female canoeists
Possibly living people
Year of birth missing (living people)
Medalists at the ICF Canoe Slalom World Championships